is a Japanese eroge visual novel developed by Nitroplus that was released on January 26, 2007. Gekkō no Carnevale has been adapted into a manga, a light novel, and a drama CD. It is a story set in a Gothic world.

Plot and Setting
The story takes place in a city resembling Italy, known as Belmonte, with the technology levels resembling levels in the late 19th century. In this city there are human-sized mechanical dolls known as "Automata" who serve the people of the city.
The protagonist, Romeo, is a taxi driver who was originally involved in an organization known as the "Orma Rossa"(Red Mark). He finds an automata in the shape of a young woman, who appears to have amnesia. He names her Anna and they start living together. However, sometime later, the Orma Rossa begin to catch up to Romeo, and an organization composed of automata also appears; thus, Romeo must fight to protect his current life.

Voice Actors
 Romeo - Michinobu Kayama 
 Anna - Miyabi Himeno
 Lunaria - Kaori Mizuhashi
 Noel - Mia Naruse
 Germano - Kamezō Yushiyanagi
 Rebecca - Kaori Okuda
 Valentino - Dai Matsuri
 Guglielmo - Kazuya Ichijo
  Silvio - Kurōzaemon Matsugami
 Carmelo - Makoto Yasumura
 Marcantonio - Daisuke Sasaki
 Iris - Runa Sakaki
 Perla - Kisato Shinuchi
 Korunarina - Erena Kaibara
 Pius - Kōtei
 Alternaria - Mia Kureno
 Davide - Kyōnosuke Hiruma
 Paolo - Itsuki Akiyama
 Fabio - Ryou Majima
 Bice - Megumi Yuki

Reception
In the first half of the year of 2007, Gekkō no Carnevale was able to net enough sales to place it as the 50th highest selling visual novel on Getchu.com.

References

External links
Gekkou no Carnevale's official website 

2007 Japanese novels
2007 manga
2007 video games
Akita Shoten manga
Bishōjo games
Eroge
Gagaga Bunko
Japan-exclusive video games
Light novels
Nitroplus
Shōnen manga
Video games about taxis
Werewolf video games
Video games developed in Japan
Visual novels
Windows games
Windows-only games